Karin Sjödin (born 8 August 1983) is a Swedish professional golfer. She played 10 seasons on the U.S.-based LPGA Tour and was in contention at the 2012 Kraft Nabisco Championship.

Amateur career
Sjödin was born  in Gothenburg, Sweden and learned golf at Delsjö Golf Club close to the city.  

In 2000 she won the Swedish Junior Match-play Championship and, still as an amateur, the Öijared Ladies Open on the Swedish Golf Tour, at the time named the Telia Tour.  

She was part of the Swedish team winning the 2000 European Girls' Team Championship at home soil in Stockholm, Sweden. She was also part of the Swedish teams capturing the silver medal at the 2002 European Lady Junior's Team Championship and the bronze medal at the 2003 European Ladies' Team Championship. 

Sjödin played in the 2002 and 2004 Espirito Santo Trophy (World Amateur Golf Team Championships} finishing on the victorious Swedish side and as individual champion in 2004.

Sjödin played college golf at Oklahoma State University where she won three events, the 2002 Topy Cup, the 2004 Mercedes-Benz of Bend Women's Fall Preview and 2004 Edean Ihlanfeldt Invitational. She was named NGCA All-America Honorable Mention from 2003–04, First-Team All-American in 2005, Big 12 Newcomer of the Year and Second-Team All-Big 12 in 2003, and First-Team Academic All-American from  2003-05. She was the NCAA individual runner-up in 2004. and named  First-Team All-Big 12 in 2004 and 2005.

Sjödin was awarded the 2005 Dinah Shore Trophy Award. Winners must have an overall grade point average (GPA) of at least 3.2 on a 4.0 scale, have played in at least 50% of her team's scheduled events, maintained a scoring average of 78 or less and demonstrated leadership skills and/or extraordinary community affairs work. She also received the 2005 Edith Cummings Munson Golf Award which goes to the student-athlete who is both an NGCA All-American Scholar and an NGCA All-American, with the award going to the highest GPA score in the event of a tie.

Professional career
She turned professional in 2005 and earned exempt status for the 2006 LPGA Tour season by finishing tied for 16th at the LPGA Final Qualifying Tournament.

She led the tour in average driving distance for the 2006 season, at 284.5 yards and received a special invitation to compete in the World Long Drive Championship, where she finished seventh.

Sjödin played in 24 majors. She shared the lead at the 2012 Kraft Nabisco Championship with Yani Tseng after three rounds. She finished the tournament tied fourth, two strokes behind Sun-Young Yoo.

Sjödin sustained a back injury in 2013 and retired after the 2015 LPGA Tour season. In 2016 she was appointed head pro at Borre Golfklubb in Horten, north of Tønsberg, Norway.

Amateur wins
2000 Swedish Junior Matchplay Championship

Source:

Professional wins

Swedish Golf Tour wins

Results in LPGA majors
Results not in chronological order before 2015.

^ The Evian Championship was added as a major in 2013.

CUT = missed the half-way cut
"T" = tied for place

LPGA Tour career summary

Official as of 22 November 2015

Team appearances
Amateur
European Girls' Team Championship (representing Sweden): 2000 (winners), 2001
European Lady Junior's Team Championship (representing Sweden): 2002
European Ladies' Team Championship (representing Sweden): 2003, 2005
Espirito Santo Trophy (representing Sweden): 2002, 2004 (winners)

Source:

References

External links

Swedish female golfers
Oklahoma State Cowgirls golfers
LPGA Tour golfers
Sportspeople from Gothenburg
1983 births
Living people